Loran Romualdo dos Santos da Silva (born 20 July 1998), commonly known as Loran, is a Brazilian footballer who currently plays as a forward for Retrô.

Career statistics

Club

Notes

References

1998 births
Living people
Brazilian footballers
Association football forwards
Bangu Atlético Clube players
Fluminense FC players
Botafogo de Futebol e Regatas players
Associação Atlética Anapolina players
Duque de Caxias Futebol Clube players
Grêmio Esportivo Bagé players
Retrô Futebol Clube Brasil players
Footballers from Rio de Janeiro (city)